Mohamed El Habachi (1939, Casablanca - 22 November 2013 in Casablanca) was a Moroccan actor. He was widely considered to be one of the pioneers of cinema and theater in Morocco, and was known for his performances in many Moroccan films such as Blood Wedding and The Barber of the Poor Quarter.

Filmography 

 1977: Blood Wedding
 1979: The Mirage
 1982: The Barber of the Poor Quarter
 1985: Forty-four, or Bedtime Stories

References 

Moroccan male actors
2013 deaths
1939 births